airG Incorporated (airG) is a Canadian software company.

History
AirG was founded and incorporated in April 2000 by Frederick Ghahramani, Vincent Yen, and Bryce Pasechnik. as a mobile entertainment content supplier and was headquartered in  Vancouver, British Columbia. The company surpassed 20 million customers in 2007, and in 2014 the company surpassed 100 million customers, representing around 40 countries. In 2010 a study  determined airG's weekly media time as one of the top 10 most frequented services on mobile phones in the United States.

Products

Mobile games 
airG released AtomicDove, a 'persistent' and 'multiplayer' game, in November 2001. In 2002, AtomicDove generated 100 million minutes of mobile data traffic. The company also developed the multiplayer farming game Big Barn World. Some games were marketed through private networks, while other were marketed internationally.

Mobile chat
The company was one of the first mobile-only social media networks. airG was the provider of the Sprint 'Games Lobby Lounge'. airG ran Conexion Latina, which was for about one million Spanish speaking customers, and created the Boost Hookt social network.

Mobile advertising 
airG sold just 2% of its 20+ billion mobile advertising impressions in 2006.
It then began to use interactive polls, and engagement units specifically to customers based on their profile information. The company has also partnered with sports sponsorship companies like Red Bull.

Recognition
In 2001, airG was awarded the BMO Bank of Montreal First Place Prize in their New Ventures B.C. competition. In 2005 airG's founders won the Young Entrepreneur of the Year award from the Business Development Bank of Canada.

References

External links
 airG Official website

Canadian entertainment websites
Companies based in Vancouver
Mobile game companies
Video game companies of Canada
Video game companies established in 2000
Mobile software
Mobile telecommunications
Mobile web
Video game development companies